Richard S. Morse (August 19, 1911 – July 1, 1988) was an American inventor and scientist credited with invention of orange juice concentrate, the founder of the Minute Maid, a member of the National Academy of Engineering, Assistant Secretary of the Army, and senior lecturer at Sloan School of Management of Massachusetts Institute of Technology.

Morse was born in Abington, Massachusetts on August 19, 1911. He received a B.S. degree from Massachusetts Institute of Technology in 1933 and did graduate work in physics at the Technische Hochschule Munich, Germany. He received honorary doctorates from Brooklyn Polytechnic Institute (1959) and Clark University. Subsequently, he spent 5 years in research work at Eastman Kodak Co. and Distillation Products, Inc, at Rochester, New York.

References

1911 births
1988 deaths
Massachusetts Institute of Technology alumni
Technical University of Munich alumni
MIT Sloan School of Management faculty
20th-century American inventors